Kathrin Dumitru (born 30 October 1980) is a German former swimmer. She competed in three events at the 1996 Summer Olympics.

References

External links
 

1980 births
Living people
German female swimmers
Olympic swimmers of Germany
Swimmers at the 1996 Summer Olympics
People from Fulda
Sportspeople from Kassel (region)